North Elmham railway station is a railway station in the village of North Elmham in the English county of Norfolk. The station was part of the Wymondham to Wells Branch (1847 - 1989), and is part of a section of the line being restored by the Mid-Norfolk Railway from Dereham to County School railway station.

History

The station was equipped with a single passenger platform on the down line.  This line was flanked by a goods loop.  The station was rebuilt by the London & North Eastern Railway, with a simple brick building replacing the earlier timber-framed building.  Passenger trains were not permitted to pass at this station.

A collision took place close to the station on 14 December 1882.

Goods trains
North Elmham was the location for a rail served dairy, with daily milk trains operating from the station to Ilford.  A shunting horse was used at Elmham to move loaded milk wagons from the down to the up side of the line for collection.  The dairy closed in October 1963.

The station also dealt in grain and fertilizer traffic.

Present day

Some materials are currently on site from the former Cambridge - St Ives railway to construct a new platform in preparation for the opening of the MNR's northern section for passengers. Construction of a new platform and the pace of track restoration between Hoe and North Elmham which relies on volunteer labour and charitable donations.

It had been proposed that there could be an additional halt built between this location and Dereham in the small hamlet of Hoe, a popular location for walkers. The Mid-Norfolk Railway's volunteers are instead concentrating efforts on restoring the line progressively towards North Elmham.

Although there are no passenger train services near this station at this time, a Transport Works Order (The Mid-Norfolk Railway Order 2001) is in place allowing the Mid-Norfolk Railway Preservation Trust to operate trains from Dereham. Planning permission for the relaying and operation of the line between County School and North Elmham was granted by Breckland District Council on 9 November 1992, with initial tracklaying starting soon after.  This grants permission, associated with the original enabling act, to operate a railway beyond the buffers north of North Elmham station (at ), where The Mid-Norfolk Railway Order 2001 ends.  Engineering trains have operated as far as the level crossing beside the former station site since 2019.

References

External links
 Photo of station soon after passenger closure
 Hertfordshire Railtours 'Anglian Vibrator' railtour at North Elmham, November 1985
 Photo of level crossing and granary (under demolition), July 1990

Heritage railway stations in Norfolk
Disused railway stations in Norfolk
Former Great Eastern Railway stations
Railway stations in Great Britain opened in 1857
Railway stations in Great Britain closed in 1964
Proposed railway stations in England
Beeching closures in England
1849 establishments in England
1857 establishments in England
North Elmham